Malcolm Paul Cantrell (August 28, 1895 – July 8, 1962) was a Democratic Tennessee politician and state senator. He was known for his political "machine" centered in McMinn County, Tennessee.

Biography
Cantrell was born on August 28, 1895 in a small southeastern McMinn County, Tennessee, community that later became Etowah, Tennessee in 1909. A descendant of Revolutionary War veteran Thomas Cantrell, he came from a large family. After serving as a conductor for the Louisville and Nashville Railroad, he managed the Etowah Water, Light, and Power Company. Along with his siblings, he owned and operated a lumber company, a natural gas company, a motor company, and a bank. He also served as a director for Citizen's National Bank in nearby Athens, Tennessee.

Active in the local Democratic Party, Cantrell was elected Sheriff of McMinn County in 1936. He was subsequently reelected in 1938 and 1940. Like his Republican predecessors, he built a local political machine. He was elected to the Tennessee Senate representing McMinn County's district in 1942 and reelected in 1944. He also served as county judge from 1942–1946. A powerful and influential figure, he served as a delegate to the Democratic National Convention in 1944.

His political power was broken in 1946 in the "Battle of Athens", a rebellion led by war veterans. After the battle, he remained in McMinn County and worked for the Tennessee Natural Gas Company. Cantrell died on July 8, 1962 at the age of 66 in a hospital in Athens, Tennessee.

References

External links

1962 deaths
1895 births
People from Etowah, Tennessee
Businesspeople from Tennessee
Tennessee state court judges
Tennessee sheriffs
Democratic Party Tennessee state senators
20th-century American politicians
20th-century American businesspeople
20th-century American judges